Teet Järvi (born 22 April 1958) is an Estonian cellist.

Teet Järvi graduated from Tallinn Music High School, studying under Laine Leichter, and from the Tallinn State Conservatoire (1981), studying in the cello class of Peeter Paemurru. He received further training in Moscow with Natalia Shahhovskaja, Mikhail Homitser and Ivan Monighetti.

In 1974, Teet Järvi won First Prize at the International Cello Competition in Czechoslovakia; he was also awarded First Prize at the National (1981) and Baltic competition (1976).

Between 1982 and 1990, Teet Järvi worked as the first cello in the Estonian National Symphony Orchestra. He has performed as a soloist with numerous orchestras, given concerts with the Tallinn String Quartet and Baltic Trio in many European countries and the United States, and has given solo recitals in several cities in the former Soviet Union and abroad.

Since 1993, Teet Järvi has been working in Finland: he plays with the Lahti Symphony Orchestra and FINEST string quartet and teaches cello at the Lahti Conservatoire.

Personal life 
His father was conductor Vallo Järvi, his uncle is Neeme Järvi and wife is pianist . Teet Järvil has five children, and all of them are musicians.

  cellist
 Miina Järvi violinist (:et)
 Mihkel Järvi pianist
 Madis Järvi violist/composer
 Martin Järvi violinist

His children are instrumentalists ensemble Järvi Instrumentalists.

External links 
Teet Järvi ja tema pool sajandit, Sirp, 15. august 2008
Pilt Teet Järvist, kultuuriaken.tartu.ee, vaadatud 12. mai 2017
Pilt Teet Järvist, sinfonialahti.fi, vaadatud 10. mai 2017
Album Estonian Cello Teet Jarvi & Vardo Rumessen, iTunes, vaadatud 10. mai 2017
Eesti interpreedid: Teet ja Marius Järvi, ERR, esmaeeter 23. veebruar 2001
Artur Kapp, prelüüd tšellole ja orkestrile, Youtube, 29. märts 2010

Estonian cellists
1958 births
Place of birth missing (living people)
Living people
20th-century Estonian musicians
21st-century Estonian musicians
20th-century cellists
21st-century cellists